Triston Javon Henry (born September 8, 1993) is a Canadian professional soccer player who plays for Forge FC in the Canadian Premier League as a goalkeeper.

Early life
Henry began playing goalkeeper in youth soccer at the age of 12. In 2013, he played with the Toronto Lynx U20 in the USL Super-20 League, winning the Safe Hands Award and being named to the All-Tournament team.

College career
Henry began his college career at Herkimer County Community College in 2012. In his two seasons, he helped the team win the NJCAA National Championship both seasons, including posting clean sheets in both championship matches. In 2012, he was the 2012 Regional Tournament MVP, an NSCAA Second Team All-American, NSCAA All-Region First Team, and was also named to the All-National Tournament First Team. In 2013, he was an NSCAA and NJCAA All-American in 2013, and was selected to the NSCAA All-Region First Team and the All-National Tournament Team. 

In 2014, he transferred to the University of Connecticut to play for the men's soccer team. He appeared in a pre-season game on August 17 against the Quinnipiac Bobcats, but did not appear in any regular season matches.

In 2015, he transferred to Quinnipiac University to play for the men's soccer team. He made his debut on August 28 against the Boston College Eagles and was named Quinnipiac Athlete of the Month for August 2015.

Club career
In 2013 and 2014, he played with the Toronto Lynx in the Premier Development League.

In 2015, he began playing with Sigma FC in League1 Ontario. In 2017, he was named a L1O Second-Team All-Star and was named to the All-Star Game roster. In 2018, he was once again named a L1O Second Team All-Star, and was once again selected to play in the All-Star Game against the PLSQ All-Star team.

In February 2019, Henry signed his first professional contract with Canadian Premier League side Forge FC, joining his former Sigma coach Bobby Smyrniotis. He made his debut in the league's first ever match on April 27, 2019 against York9 FC. He helped Forge with the first ever CPL title in 2019. In 2020, he helped Forge win their second consecutive league championship and won the Golden Glove Award as the league's top goalkeeper. Forge then subsequently picked up his option for the 2021 season. In his third season, he helped Forge reach the Championship final for the third straight season, however they did not win the title, although he was a finalist for the Golden Glove Award. In 2022, he won his third CPL title in four seasons with Forge. In January 2023, Henry re-signed with Forge on a multi-year deal.

Career statistics

Honours

Club
Forge FC
Canadian Premier League: 2019, 2020, 2022

Individual
 League1 Ontario Second Team All Star: 2017, 2018
 Canadian Premier League Golden Glove: 2020

References

External links

1993 births
Living people
Association football goalkeepers
Canadian soccer players
Soccer players from Toronto
Sportspeople from Scarborough, Toronto
Black Canadian soccer players
Canadian expatriate soccer players
Expatriate soccer players in the United States
Canadian expatriate sportspeople in the United States
UConn Huskies men's soccer players
Quinnipiac Bobcats men's soccer players
USL League Two players
League1 Ontario players
Canadian Premier League players
Toronto Lynx players
Forge FC players
Sigma FC players